Muhammad Farooq Khan was a Pakistani psychiatrist, scholar of Islam and vice-chancellor of University of Swat.

He was known for his opposition to Islamist militancy and described suicide attacks as un-Islamic. Due to his views, he was assassinated on October 2, 2010.

He got his basic education from district Swabi. He then joined Cadet College, Hasanabdal and later on Cadet College, Kohat. After having studied medicine, he decided to specialize in psychiatry. He established his private practice in Baghdada, Mardan. The Government of Pakistan had appointed him as the first Vice-Chancellor of Swat Islamic University some time before his death. He was awarded Sitara e Imtiaz posthumously by the Government of Pakistan for his services.
Khan was a psychiatrist by profession. He frequently took part in television talk shows at which he used to criticise militants and described suicide attacks as un-Islamic.

In his student days, he was an active member of the Islami Jamiat-i-Talaba. Later on, he took part in a general election on a Jamaat-i-Islami ticket. However, he was expelled from the Jamaat after writing a book. For some time he also remained associated with the Tehrik-i-Insaf.

Books
He was the author of several books on different issues but his main interest areas were the study of Quran and Islam.
Khan was the author of several books including the following:
Pakistan and the Twenty First Century (Urdu),
Jihad, Qital and Islamic world (Urdu)
What is Islam? (Urdu)
Islam and Women (Urdu & English)
Dialogue with the West (English)
Kashmir Issue (Urdu & English)
The questions of Modern Mind and Reply of Islam (Urdu)
Critical study of Ordinance of Hudood, Qisas and Diyat (Urdu)

Assassination

He was assassinated on 2 October 2010 in his clinic at Baghdada, Mardan when two armed young men entered his clinic and opened fire at him. Dr Khan and his assistant died at the spot. Taliban claims responsibility of his murder.
He was the Vice-Chancellor of University of Swat.

References 

Personal Website
The loss of an Intellectual
A Moderate Scholar is silenced

External links 
 Common ground news
 Daily times news about Dr Farooq
Swat university VC Assassinated
Assassination of Dr Farooq
Poem in memory of Dr Farooq Khan

1956 births
2010 deaths
20th-century Muslim scholars of Islam
Pakistani educators
Pashtun people
Pakistani Muslim scholars of Islam
People from Swabi District
Pakistani academic administrators
People killed by the Tehrik-i-Taliban Pakistan
Deaths by firearm in Khyber Pakhtunkhwa